John F. Hamilton (November 7, 1893 – July 11, 1967) was an American-born actor who worked for many years in the theatre but only occasionally on film. He is probably best-remembered as Pops, father of Eva Marie Saint's character, in Elia Kazan's film classic On the Waterfront (1954). He was known as John F. Hamilton to distinguish him from the much more prolific American film actor John Hamilton (who played "Perry White" on TV) and also from a British actor of youthful roles who worked in England and Europe in the 1930s.

Filmography

External links

1893 births
1967 deaths
American male film actors
American male stage actors
Male actors from New York City
20th-century American male actors